George MacLean Park (27 September 1914 – 8 May 1994)  was a British Labour Party politician.

Born in Glasgow, Park was educated at the Onslow Drive Grammar School and Whitehill Grammar School, then moved to Coventry, where he studied at Coventry Technical College.  He worked in the motor industry in Coventry, where he was the Amalgamated Engineering Union Convenor at the Ryton Plant of the (then) Rootes Group.  He was a councillor in the Holbrooks Ward and later leader of Coventry City Council and the West Midlands County Council.

Park served as Member of Parliament (MP) for Coventry North East from February 1974 to 1987.  He was a TGWU-sponsored MP and was Parliamentary Private Secretary to Eric Varley.

He decided not to stand for re-election in the run-up to the 1987 general election, after the left wing won control of his Constituency Labour Party.  His successor was John Hughes.

References

External links 
 

1914 births
1994 deaths
Amalgamated Engineering Union-sponsored MPs
Labour Party (UK) MPs for English constituencies
UK MPs 1974
UK MPs 1974–1979
UK MPs 1979–1983
UK MPs 1983–1987
Councillors in the West Midlands (county)
Coventry City Councillors